The 2010 Samarkand Challenger was a professional tennis tournament played on outdoor red clay courts. It was the fourteenth edition of the tournament which was part of the 2010 ATP Challenger Tour. It took place in Samarkand, Uzbekistan between 9 and 14 August 2010.

ATP entrants

Seeds

 Rankings are as of August 2, 2010.

Other entrants
The following players received wildcards into the singles main draw:
  Tiago Fernandes
  Murad Inoyatov
  Abduvoris Saidmukhamedov
  Vaja Uzakov

The following players received a Special Exempt into the main draw:
  Jun Woong-sun

The following players received entry from the qualifying draw:
  Laurynas Grigelis
  Andrej Martin
  Axel Michon
  Artem Smirnov

Champions

Singles

 Andrej Martin def.  Marek Semjan, 6–4, 7–5

Doubles

 Andis Juška /  Deniss Pavlovs def.  Lee Hsin-han /  Yang Tsung-hua, 7–5, 6–3

External links
Official website
ITF search 
2010 Draws

Samarkand Challenger
Samarkand Challenger
2010 in Uzbekistani sport
August 2010 sports events in Asia